Raymond Green Jr. (born March 22, 1977) is a former American football defensive back who played for the Carolina Panthers, Miami Dolphins, New York Jets and New York Giants of the National Football League (NFL). He played college football at University of South Carolina.

References 

1977 births
Living people
American football defensive backs
South Carolina Gamecocks football players
Carolina Panthers players
Miami Dolphins players
New York Jets players
New York Giants players